Desert dandelion is a common name for several plants and may refer to:

 Malacothrix, a genus of North American plants in the family Asteraceae
 Taraxacum desertorum, a species of dandelion native to the Caucasus

See also 
 Dandelion